The Nunziatina is a Baroque-style, Roman Catholic oratory or small church at the north end of Via del Seminario, near the Todi Cathedral, in the center of Todi, province of Perugia, region of Umbria, Italy.

History
The oratory was founded in the 17th century through a gift of land by the Bishop Angelo Cesi, to a local confraternity of the Santissima Annunziata, which had been active since the 13th-century. The confraternity was putatively involved in ministering to passing pilgrims. Over the years, the prayer hall was enriched with frescoes and paintings. Putatively a former paneled ceiling was destroyed in a fire in 1700. Among the paintings present now are works by Andrea Polinori, including a 1627 depiction of Jacopone da Todi.

References

Churches in Todi
Baroque architecture in Umbria